Aaqbe, Akbeh, Aqbe, Akbe, Aaqabet, el-Aaqbe, Akraba, Aaqabet Rashaya or Akabe  (العقبه) is a village and municipality situated  west of Rashaya in the Rashaya District of the Beqaa Governorate in Lebanon.

Roman temple
The village contains the vestiges of a Roman temple, one of Mount Hermon group of temples . The temple is situated on a hill with a commanding view of Mount Hermon. George F. Taylor classified it as an Antae temple of a rugged design that lacked decoration. He noted that the doorway of the temple does not face the summit; it aligns instead to a northerly area of the mountain that is covered by a ridge. The temple featured a niche that may have housed a cult statue of which only the framing columns have survived. Three sections of the east antae pillar were also still in place.

References

Bibliography

External links
Aaqabet,  Localiban 
Photo of Aaqbe village on ugo.cn
Photos of Roman temples in the Rashaya area on the American University of Beirut website
Roman Temples on discoverlebanon.com
3D Google Earth map of En Nebi Safa on www.gmap3d.com
 Aaqabet Rashaya on wikimapia
 Aaqabet Rashaya on wikimapia

Populated places in Rashaya District
Archaeological sites in Lebanon
Ancient Roman temples
Roman sites in Lebanon
Tourist attractions in Lebanon